The Tibet Post is an online publication founded by a group of Tibetan journalists with the primary goal of promoting democracy through freedom of expression within Tibetan communities both within and outside of Tibet.

Introduction

TPI's daily online newspaper provides uncensored news to inform and educate readers about Tibet-related issues at home and in exile, which are acknowledged internationally, also  reported by the Chinese state media.

Creation 

Created on December 10, 2007, in the Tibetan exile community of Dharamsala in the Himalayan region of Northern India, it was the first independent trilingual daily online newspaper-in-exile, publishing in English, Tibetan and Mandarin, and remains the only one in existence. The publication celebrates a readership of nearly 10 million per year from 2017, and maintains a general readership of between 500 and 10,000 online guests at any given time. The initiative of an independent non-profit organisation, Tibet Post focuses on Tibet-related issues, closely following the developments inside Tibet as well as reporting on the activities and workings of the exile community's democratic institutions.

Bi-monthly newspaper 

The TPI has launched a fortnightly newspaper. The eight-page broadsheet, containing a wide range of news and features covering events both inside Tibet and the exiled Tibetan world, was launched at the Dalai Lama’s main temple in McLeod Ganj, on Monday, December 10, 2012, to coincide with International Human Rights Day and Nobel Peace Prize Day of the Dalai Lama of Tibet. However, we anticipate discontinuing the printed version from August 2018.

Circulation 

The publication's website is considered a strong force in the Tibetan community and representing people in Tibet and Tibetan people's voice reaching to the outside world,  promoting peaceful interaction between Tibetans and Chinese as well as objectivity, making it unique in its traditional regions of Tibet and a free news source that reaches and informs many in the remote community it serves. The Tibet Post publication has been heralded as a strong force in educating Chinese seeking objective viewpoints on the situation in Tibet. According to its website cpanel and Google analysis, an estimated 60% of its readers are thought to be logging on from inside China, giving it the largest readership of any Tibetan news source-in-exile, and making it the only one claiming a majority of Chinese readers.

Subjects such as human rights, censorship, and the Tibetan cause in China are the driving forces behind the non-profit organisation, 'Himalayan Literacy Trust' (HLT) by whom it was created. The HLT is part of an affiliation which also includes  Reporters Without Borders (RSF) the international freedom of press watchdog organisations in and outside of India, with focus on the 'very serious' situation regarding freedom of expression in China and Tibet.

Mission 

TPI’s mission is to advocate for democracy, peace, justice, political pluralism and rule of law in Tibetan society, and to give voice to the people of the three Tibetan provinces. These goals are guided by the principles of non-violence and compassion. It is an interactive publication, which encourages readers’ comments, phone calls and e-mails, and conducts interviews and opinion polls to promote freedom of expression and dialogue.

Over the past two and a half years, TPI has become one of the most popular news websites amongst Tibetan communities in exile and, although it is difficult to access in Tibet, it is recognised as an important news source. HLT and TPI’s founding members are all scholars who have undergone intensive religious and secular studies under highly accomplished Tibetan teachers.

In addition to covering news and political issues, the site includes sections on health, the environment, arts and culture, opinion, and the Tibetan diaspora. Its sister sites also include statistical information and opinion polls.

TPI's website features a bi-monthly, downloadable and printable newspaper which features high-profile articles from the website. In 2012, TPI has started to print the newspaper itself and distribute it free of charge to individuals and institutions within the Tibetan diaspora, particularly targeting readers who have limited or no internet access. TPI's services are unique because they originate in the heart of the Tibetan exile community, providing a daily link between the Tibetans in Tibet and the exile community and the rest of the free world. TPI exploits new media tools such as Facebook, Twitter and YouTube, and regularly uploads feature stories, video reports and interviews from its sources- Tibet, exile and abroad.

Investigations 
Investigations into China's human rights situation have shown that torture is used routinely in many prisons and interrogations. In 2016 the TPI submitted evidence to the UK Conservative Party Human Rights Commission: Human Rights in China, detailing the record of abuse inside Tibet between 2013-2016. Subsequently the Committee concluded that torture in Tibet is "The Darkest Moment: The Crackdown on Human Rights in China, 2013-16. ".

TPI has also worked alongside world leaders and activists such as Henri Malosse-EESC President, Michael Caster-Human rights advocate, researcher, and civil society consultant, Alan Gilbert, a John Evans professor at the Josef Korbel School of International Studies at the University of Denver, and Rose Tang-Chinese writer and activist. TPI also closely worked with governments and NGOs such as Reporters Without Borders, The Committee to Protect Journalists, the United States' Congressional-Executive Commission on China and U.S. Department of State, to share its reports of tortured Tibetans inside Tibet.

Books published in their chronological order
1) '25 June 2015 : Launching literacy book title: "Roar Within  Ehythm," a collection of 119 writers and bloggers, 60 of them from inside Tibet (Successful attempt to bridge between bloggers in Tibet and exile)

2) From July 2016; as its close to election days, as mentioned earlier, we began to prepared to publish a new book in Tibetan language title: "Focusing the real Subject," and launched on May 20, 2016; a collection of more than 30 interviews with Prime Minister (Sikyong) candidates, top officials from various bodies and NGO leaders, ex-political prisoners and other interest individuals (an attempt to bridge between community leaders and general public). The book is focusing on Tibetan democracy and human rights, particularly on recent Tibetan elections. However only two top officials refused to accept our interview, but we have clearly mentioned in the book editorial and stated why we are regret about their failed response.

3) On 10 December 2015, TPI released a new book titled: "Voice of an Exiled Tibetan", to mark the 25th Anniversary Celebration of the Dalai Lama's receipt of the Nobel Peace Prize and the 66th International Human Rights Day. The book is primarily a compilation of more than 50 analytical articles related to the modern issues facing all Tibetans—at home and in exile—and seeks to serve as a response to how Tibet is portrayed by China and other outlets.

4) On 15 February, Deputy Speaker of Tibetan Parliament in Exile Acharya Yeshi Phuntsok launched a book of interviews with exiled Tibetan women writers and their works titled “Women Who Hold The Pen” at the Tibet Post International office in Mcleod Ganj.

The book comprises the interviews of 33 exiled Tibetan women writers across the world, which included 15 published authors and other enthusiastic readers of Tibetan language.

Headquarters 

The Tibet Post office headquarters are located in the district magistrate of Kangra, Himachal Pradesh, India, and is supported by the South Tyrol Regional Parliament, Italy, with contributions also made from Delhi, India, Austria, Taiwan, the UK and the USA. Its Editor-in-Chief is Yeshe Choesang, who is also the founder of HLT, TPI Agency, India; and other editors include Keary Huang (Editor for the Chinese version of TPI, Taipei, Taiwan), Kalsang Dolma (Assistant editor for Tibetan version of the Tibet Post International, India), and James Dunn (was reporter for The Tibet Europe).

Goals and Objectives 

In order to achieve its goals, HLT and TPI have identified the following objectives and guiding principles:

1) To provide a fair and accurate news service which covers the political and social situation in Tibet, and to promote its access internationally, including to Tibetan people living in China

2) To inform and engage members of the Tibetan diaspora and others, especially English-speaking foreigners, about social issues affecting Tibetan communities in exile

3) To promote through its publications the principles of democracy, freedom of expression, social justice, political and legislative debate, political pluralism, women’s rights, rule of law, public empowerment, peace, non-violence and peaceful conflict resolution

4) To encourage and support the needs of Tibetan journalists living in exile, through professional development

5) To promote and encourage greater knowledge among Tibetan journalists about the democratic government-in-exile and social, political, health and environmental issues

6) To employ a multicultural, multilingual editorial staff, including volunteers from around the world, and encourage discussion and debate from different perspectives on issues related to Tibet and Tibetans

7) To support English-language acquisition and awareness of current events amongst Tibetan youths living in exile, in both schools and the wider community

8) To maintain our unique role as a provider of wide, in-depth and up-to-the-minute coverage of Tibet-related news and current affairs

9) To contribute to the nurturing of a strong Tibetan society by promoting support for the Tibetan cause both internationally and within Tibet.

References

External links 
 Tibet Post Online
 Tibet Digital Times
 Outlook Tibet/ Online Magazine
 Potala Post Chinese
 Shambala Post Tibetan blog
 Downloadable PDF Newspaper

Other links 
 BBC
 CPJ
 IFEX
 Vaclav Havel Library Foundation
 US Congressional-Executive Commission on China
 Tibetan Environmental Watch
 U.S. Department of State
 UK's Conservative Party Human Rights Commission
 U.K. Tibet Society
 National Endowment for Democracy

Internet properties established in 2007
Online publishing companies
Tibetan news websites